This is a list of Munro mountains and Munro Tops in Scotland by height. In addition, the SMC define Munro Tops, as Scottish peaks above  that are not considered Munros. Where the SMC lists a Munro Top, due to "insufficient separation", it will also list the "Parent Peak", a Munro, of the Munro Top. As of 6 September 2012, there were 282 Scottish Munros after the SMC confirmed that Beinn a' Chlaidheimh had been downgraded to a Corbett and as of 10 December 2020, there were 226 Scottish Munro Tops after Stob Coire na Cloiche, a Munro Top to Parent Peak Sgùrr nan Ceathramhnan, was surveyed at 912.5m and was deleted as a Munro Top and downgraded to a Corbett Top. The current SMC list totals 508 summits.

The Munro Top, Càrn na Criche, would rank as the 5th largest Munro, if judged only on height.

Some authors have attempted to redefine Munros based on objective metric criteria. , 202 of the 282 Munros had a prominence above . Such hills have been called Real Munros or Marilyn Munros. No Munro Top had a prominence above  (i.e. no Munro Top was a Marilyn). 130 Munros had a height above  and a prominence above , while 88 had a prominence above . Both categories have been called Metric Munros. None of these classifications have achieved significant popularity.

The list of Munros dates from 1891, and 255 of the 282 Munros below, were on the original 1891 list; while 28 of the 226 Munro Tops, were once Munros.  Climbers who complete all Munros in the prevailing Munro's Tables are called Munroists, and the first Munroist was A. E. Robertson in 1901; his is recorded as Munroist Number 1 on the official SMC list, which by 31 December 2022, numbered 7,390 names.  Munroists are eligible to join the Munro Society.

Munro mountains by height
This list was downloaded from the Database of British and Irish Hills ("DoBIH") on 19 March 2023, and are peaks the DoBIH marks as being Munros ("M").  The SMC updates its list of official Munros from time to time, and the DoBIH also updates its measurements as new surveys are recorded, so these tables should not be amended or updated unless the entire DoBIH data is re-downloaded.

Munro Tops by height

This list was downloaded from the DoBIH in December 2021, and is restricted to peaks which the DoBIH marks as being Munro Tops ("MT").  The SMC updates its list of official Munro Tops from time to time, and the DoBIH also updates its measurements as more detailed surveys are recorded, so these tables should not be amended or updated unless the entire DoBIH data is re-downloaded again.

Bibliography

DoBIH codes
The DoBIH uses the following codes for the various classifications of mountains and hills in the British Isles, which many of the above peaks also fall into:

suffixes:
=	twin

See also
List of Munros in Scotland by Section
List of mountains of the British Isles by height
List of mountains of the British Isles by prominence
Lists of mountains and hills in the British Isles
Lists of mountains in Ireland
List of Murdos (mountains)
List of Corbetts (mountains)
List of Grahams (mountains)
List of Donald mountains in Scotland
List of Furth mountains in the British Isles
List of P600 mountains in the British Isles
List of Marilyns in the British Isles

Notes

References

External links
 Scottish Mountaineering Club - The SMC maintain the lists of Munros, Munro Tops, Furths, Corbetts and Donalds. They also keep a record of Completionists.
 Walkhighlands – Features podcasts giving the correct pronunciation and place-name meanings, a 3D visualisation of every route, gradient profiles and route downloads for GPS devices.
 MunroMagic.com – Munro, Corbett and Graham descriptions, pictures, location maps, walking routes and weather reports.
 Hill Bagging - the online version of the Database of British and Irish Hills - Survey reports, the change control database and the GPS database are on Hill Bagging.
 The Munros and Tops 1891–1997 – Spreadsheet showing changes in successive editions of Munros Tables.
 Ordnance Survey Munro Blog - OS is Britain's mapping agency. They make the most up-to-date and accurate maps of the United Kingdom. They have also produced a blog on the Munros.
 Harold Street Munros Lists of GPS waypoints + Grid References for walking in UK mountains and hills in various GPS file formats.
 ScottishHills.com – Hillwalking forum with Munro, Corbett, Graham and Donald, Sub 200's log, maps and trip reports.
The Relative Hills of Britain, a website dedicated to mountain and hill classification.
PeakBagger.com, a detailed searchable database of global mountains.
360Routes.com - Munro route details with 360° virtual tour, map, 3D model and GPX download.

 List
Munros